"How Are You" is a 1985 song by The Kinks.

How Are You may also refer to:

 How Are You? (Nico Touches the Walls album), 2007
 How Are You? (film), a 2009 Turkish film
 "How Are You? John Morgan", a song resulted from "Here's your mule", a Confederate catchphrase during the American Civil War
 How Are You? (TV series), a 2019 Singaporean TV series
 "How Are You?" (EXID song), 2019

See also
 How Do You Do (disambiguation)
 How You Been (disambiguation)
 How Have You Been (disambiguation)